The tenth government of the French mandate for Lebanon on 10 July 1937, headed by Khayreddin al-Ahdab for the third time. Although it's not a completely new cabinet, but it's considered like that after the Constitutional Bloc members requested the re-discussion of the confidence. That was due to the cabinet turning from a national unity government to a National Bloc government, after President Émile Eddé appointed George Tabet and Khalil Abou Lamaa, both Nationals, after Michel Zakour, one of two Constitutional ministers, died of a heart attack. The other Constitutional minister, Ahmad al-Husseini, joined the National Bloc later. The government won the confidence with 13 votes against 12. On 30 October 1937, the Constitutionals outnumbered the Nationals, after one national joined the bloc and so requested - for the second time - the re-discussion of the confidence. The president dissolved the parliament, and the fourth cabinet of Khayreddin al-Ahdab was formed.

Composition

References 

Cabinets established in 1937
Cabinets disestablished in 1937
Cabinets of Lebanon
1937 establishments in Lebanon
1937 disestablishments in Lebanon